Melvyn Douglas (born Melvyn Edouard Hesselberg, April 5, 1901 – August 4, 1981) was an American actor.  Douglas came to prominence in the 1930s as a suave leading man, perhaps best typified by his performance in the romantic comedy Ninotchka (1939) with Greta Garbo. Douglas later played mature and fatherly characters, as in his Academy Award-winning performances in Hud (1963) and Being There (1979) and his Academy Award–nominated performance in I Never Sang for My Father (1970). Douglas was one of 24 performers to win the Triple Crown of Acting. In the last few years of his life Douglas appeared in films with supernatural stories involving ghosts. Douglas appeared as "Senator Joseph Carmichael" in The Changeling in 1980 and Ghost Story in 1981 in his final completed film role.

Early life
Douglas was born in Macon, Georgia, the son of Lena Priscilla (née Shackelford) and Edouard Gregory Hesselberg, a concert pianist and composer. His father was a Jewish emigrant from Riga, Latvia, then part of Russia. His mother, a native of Tennessee, was Protestant and a Mayflower descendant.

Douglas, in his autobiography, See You at the Movies (1987), wrote that he was unaware of his Jewish background until later in his youth: "I did not learn about the non-Christian part of my heritage until my early teens," as his parents preferred to hide his Jewish heritage. It was his aunts, on his father's side, who told him "the truth" when he was 14. He writes that he "admired them unstintingly"; and they in turn treated him like a son.

Though his father, a prominent concert pianist, taught music at a succession of colleges in the U.S. and Canada, Douglas never graduated from high school. He took the surname of his maternal grandmother and became known as Melvyn Douglas.

Career

He served in the United States Army in World War I. He established an outdoor theatre in Chicago. He had a long theatre, film and television career as a lead player, stretching from his 1930 Broadway role in Tonight or Never (opposite his future wife, Helen Gahagan) until just before his death. Douglas shared top billing with Boris Karloff and Charles Laughton in James Whale's sardonic horror classic The Old Dark House in 1932.

He was the hero in the 1932 horror film The Vampire Bat and the sophisticated leading man in 1935's She Married Her Boss. He played opposite Joan Crawford in several films, most notably A Woman's Face (1941), and appeared opposite Greta Garbo in three films: As You Desire Me (1932), Ninotchka (1939) and Garbo's final film Two-Faced Woman (1941). One of his most sympathetic roles was as the belatedly attentive father in Captains Courageous (1937).

During World War II, Douglas served first as a director of the Arts Council in the Office of Civilian Defense, and he then again served in the United States Army rising to the rank of major in the Special Services Entertainment Production Unit.  According to his granddaughter Illeana Douglas, it was in Burma when he first met his future Being There co-star Peter Sellers, who was in the Royal Air Force during the war. He returned to play more mature roles in The Sea of Grass and Mr. Blandings Builds His Dream House. In 1959 he made his musical debut playing Captain Boyle in the ill-fated Marc Blitzstein musical Juno, based on Seán O'Casey's Juno and the Paycock.

From November 1952 to January 1953, Douglas starred in the DuMont detective show Steve Randall (Hollywood Off Beat) which then moved to CBS. In the summer of 1953, he briefly hosted the DuMont game show Blind Date. In the summer of 1959, Douglas hosted eleven original episodes of a CBS Western anthology television series called Frontier Justice, a production of Dick Powell's Four Star Television.

As he aged, Douglas took on older-man and fatherly roles, in such movies as Hud (1963), for which he won his first Academy Award for Best Supporting Actor, The Americanization of Emily (1964), an episode of The Fugitive (1966), I Never Sang for My Father (1970), for which he was nominated for the Academy Award for Best Actor, and The Candidate (1972). He won his second Academy Award for Best Supporting Actor for the comedy-drama Being There (1979).  However, Douglas confirmed in one of his final interviews that he refused to attend the 52nd Academy Awards because he could not bear competing against child actor Justin Henry for Kramer vs. Kramer.

In addition to his Academy Awards, Douglas won a Tony Award for his Broadway lead role in the 1960 The Best Man by Gore Vidal, and an Emmy for his 1967 role in Do Not Go Gentle Into That Good Night.

Douglas' final completed screen appearance was in Ghost Story (1981). He did not finish shooting all of his scenes for the film The Hot Touch (1982) before his death; the film had to be edited to compensate for Douglas' incomplete role.

Douglas has two stars on the Hollywood Walk of Fame, one for movies at 6423 Hollywood Blvd. and one for television at 6601 Hollywood Blvd.

Personal life 
Douglas was married briefly to artist Rosalind Hightower, and they had one child, (Melvyn) Gregory Hesselberg, in 1926. Hesselberg, an artist, is the father of actress Illeana Douglas.

In 1931, Douglas married actress-turned-politician Helen Gahagan. They traveled to Europe that same year, and "were horrified by French and German anti-Semitism". As a result, they became outspoken anti-fascists.

Gahagan, as a three-term Congresswoman, was later Richard Nixon's opponent for the United States Senate seat from California in 1950. Nixon accused Gahagan of being soft on Communism because of her opposition to the House Un-American Activities Committee. Nixon went so far as to infamously call her "pink right down to her underwear". It was Gahagan who popularized Nixon's epithet "Tricky Dick".

The couple hired architect Roland Coate to design a home for them in 1938 on a three-acre lot they owned in Outpost Estates, Los Angeles. The result was a one-story, 6,748-square-foot home.

Douglas and Gahagan had two children: Peter Gahagan Douglas (1933) and Mary Helen Douglas (1938). The couple remained married until Helen Gahagan Douglas' death in 1980 from cancer. Melvyn Douglas died a year later, in 1981, aged 80, from pneumonia and cardiac complications in New York City.

Broadway roles

 A Free Soul (1928) as Ace Wilfong 
 Back Here (1928) as Sergeant "Terry" O'Brien
 Now-a-Days (1929) as Boyd Butler
 Recapture (1930) as Henry C. Martin
 Tonight or Never (1931) as the Unknown Gentleman 
 No More Ladies (1934) as Sheridan Warren
 Mother Lode (1934) as Carey Ried (also staged)
 De Luxe (1935) as Pat Dantry
 Tapestry In Gray (1935) as Erik Nordgren
 Two Blind Mice (1949) as Tommy Thurston
 The Bird Cage (1950) as Wally Williams 
 The Little Blue Light (1951) as Frank
 Glad Tidings (1951) as Steve Whitney 
 Time Out for Ginger (1952) as Howard Carol 
 Inherit the Wind (1955) as Henry Drummond (replacement) 
 The Waltz of the Toreadors (1958) as General St. Pé
 Juno (1959) as "Captain" Jack Boyle
 The Gang's All Here (1959) as Griffith P. Hastings
 The Best Man (1960) as William Russell 
 Spofford (1967) as Spofford

Douglas also staged Moor Born (1934), Mother Lode (1934) and Within the Gates (1934-1935) and produced Call Me Mister (1946-1948).

Sources: Internet Broadway Database and Playbill

Filmography

Source: Internet Movie Database

Partial television credits

Source: Internet Movie Database

Radio appearances

References

Sources

External links

 
 "Melvyn Douglas (1901–1981)" at the New Georgia Encyclopedia
 
 
 Melvyn Douglas Papers at the Wisconsin Center for Film and Theater Research
 Photographs and literature on Melvyn Douglas

1901 births
1981 deaths
20th-century American male actors
Male actors from Georgia (U.S. state)
American male film actors
United States Army personnel of World War II
American people of English descent
American people of Latvian-Jewish descent
American male stage actors
American male television actors
Best Supporting Actor Academy Award winners
Best Supporting Actor Golden Globe (film) winners
California Democrats
Deaths from pneumonia in New York City
Metro-Goldwyn-Mayer contract players
New York (state) Democrats
Outstanding Performance by a Lead Actor in a Miniseries or Movie Primetime Emmy Award winners
Tony Award winners
Spouses of California politicians
Upper Canada College alumni
United States Army officers
United States Army personnel of World War I